Château d'Ossogne is a castle located in Thuillies, Hainaut Province in Belgium.

See also
List of castles in Belgium

References

Castles in Belgium